Sphegina taiwanensis is a species of hoverfly in the family Syrphidae.

Distribution
Taiwan.

References

Eristalinae
Insects described in 2018
Diptera of Asia